Eat Already? 2 is a Singaporean Cantonese- and Hokkien-language drama series which is telecast on Singapore's free-to-air channel, Mediacorp Channel 8. It stars Marcus Chin, Aileen Tan, Liu Lingling, Lee Bao'en, Chen Shucheng , Hong Huifang as the casts of the second installment with special appearance Amy Khor.

Plot
The series depicts the lives of dessert stall owner Ah Soon and his wife, who struggle to keep their business afloat as a new business competitor moves into the coffee shop. At home, their daughter Pei Shi aspires to be a singer despite their objections. Family tension runs high as Ah Soon's sister-in-law, Kym, moves in with them and supports Pei Shi's singing aspirations.

As the Soons grapple with their problems, their community also faces its own challenges. How will they support one another through life's ups and downs, and what will they learn from their experiences?

Cast

Zeng Family

Yuan Family

Other characters

Cameo appearance

Development 
The series is a collaboration between the Ministry of Communications and Information (MCI) and Mediacorp, in partnership with Chuan Pictures and Tribal Worldwide.

Filming started on 9 December 2016.

Accolades

Asian Television Award

Music

References

2017 Singaporean television series debuts
2017 Singaporean television series endings
Hokkien-language television shows
2017 Singaporean television seasons
Channel 8 (Singapore) original programming